Sabroom railway station, code SBRM, is a railhead railway station which serves Sabroom town in South Tripura district of Tripura state of India. It is located near Feni River which serves as Bangladesh–India border.

History 

The Sabroom railway station is the terminus railhead of the 113 km long  broad-gauge Agartala–Sabroom railway line which comes under the Lumding railway division of the Northeast Frontier Railway zone of Indian Railways. It is a single line without electrification. On 3 October 2019, the first DEMU serving Agartala–Sabroom performed its inaugural run after the construction of railway line was completed. In 2016, 43 km long segment from Agartala to Udaipur near Mata Tripura Sundari temple was completed. On 3 October 2019, the remaining Udaipur-Sabroom segment was also completed.

Station layout

Future connectivity

The rail link from South Tripura district will be extended to Chittagong Port and Cox's Bazar deep water port in Bangladesh, as agreed by the prime ministers of the both countries, by rehabilitating the railway link from Santir Bazar railway station in India to Feni Junction railway station in Bangladesh. Maitri Setu bridge near Sabroom was opened in 2021 to connect the "Belonia, India–Parshuram, Bangladesh road and rail crossing checkposts".

See also

References

External links

 Indian Railways site
 Indian railway fan club

Railway stations in South Tripura district
Lumding railway division
Railway terminus in India